Presidential elections were held for the first time in Iceland on 29 June 1952 following the death of incumbent President Sveinn Björnsson. The result was a victory for Ásgeir Ásgeirsson, who received 48.3% of the vote, resulting in the first contested election in the history of Iceland.

Results

References

Iceland
Presidential election
Presidential elections in Iceland
Iceland